"Of the Night" is a song by British  band Bastille, released on 11 October 2013 as the lead single from All This Bad Blood (2013), a reissue of their debut studio album Bad Blood (2013). The song debuted at number two on the UK Singles Chart, and has also charted in several other countries.

The song was covered by Ellie Goulding at BBC Radio 1's Live Lounge.

Background and release
"Of the Night" is a mash up of two 1990s Eurodance songs, the 1993 hit "The Rhythm of the Night" by Italian act Corona and the 1992 hit "Rhythm Is a Dancer" by German group Snap!. The song was first featured on Bastille's mixtape Other People's Heartache, which was released in 2012 as a free download.

"Of the Night" was later used in a promotional trailer for the eighth series of ITV's Dancing on Ice in January 2013. It received its first radio play on Huw Stephens' BBC Radio 1 show on 9 October 2013, and was released digitally on 11 October 2013. On 15 November 2013, Of the Night EP was released, featuring three remixes of the song and a live recording of "Oblivion".

Critical reception

Paul Leake of Click Music gave the track five out of five stars, and called it "one of the most inspired covers ever made," adding that it evokes "doe-eyed nostalgia for the purity of 90s' dance music" and "modulates between the sombre heartbreak and quiet intensity."

Digital Spy's Robert Copsey wrote, "On paper, Dan Smith & Co.'s gloomy, atmospheric re-working sounds like career-suicide, and while it certainly isn't that, by opting for such a daring choice it feels like all their hard work at carefully carving out their own niche has come undone."

Commercial performance
While set to become the band's first number one single at the midweek stage, the song debuted at number two on the UK Singles Chart, selling 80,257 copies in its first week, only 660 copies less than Lily Allen's version of "Somewhere Only We Know", becoming the narrowest chart race of 2013.

Music video
An official music video promoting the song was released onto YouTube on 9 October 2013. It was directed by Dave Ma (who has previously worked with Foals, Ghostpoet and Delphic), and stars American actor James Russo (Once Upon a Time in America, Django Unchained) as the main protagonist, a Los Angeles police detective who visits several crime scenes, including a woman shot at a motel, a woman overdosed on pills, a man drowned in a pool, a woman asphyxiated in a car trunk, a store clerk shot during a robbery, and a woman in a bathroom with her throat slashed. The corpses sing along with the music (it is heavily implied that the police detective is going crazy, hallucinating seeing the corpses sing, with their voices lip-synced). At one point the band members are seen conversing with the police, then told to face the wall and put their hands on their heads, while an officer searches them. The video ends with the police detective lying on the floor of a bathroom, singing along with the last few lines of the song. The camera pans out to reveal he has slashed his wrists. Mike Wass of Idolator called the video "quite possibly the most depressing video of the year."

Track listing

Digital download
 "Of the Night" – 3:34

Digital download (EP)
 "Of the Night" – 3:34
 "Oblivion" (Live from Capitol Studios) – 3:08
 "Of the Night" (MNEK Remix) – 4:38
 "Of the Night" (Icarus Remix) – 5:20
 "Of the Night" (Kove Remix) – 6:15
 "Of the Night" (music video) – 3:51

CD maxi single
 "Of the Night" – 3:34
 "Of the Night" (MNEK Remix) – 4:38

10" vinyl (limited to 1,000 copies)
Side A
 "Of the Night" – 3:34
 "Of the Night" (MNEK Remix) – 4:38

Side B
 "Oblivion" (Live from Capitol Studios) – 3:08
 "Of the Night" (Icarus Remix) – 5:20

Charts and certifications

Weekly charts

Year-end charts

Certifications

Release history

See also
Mashup (music)
Being Nobody – by Richard X vs. Liberty X

References

Bastille (band) songs
2013 singles
Mashup songs
2013 songs
Virgin Records singles
Songs written by Ann Lee (singer)
Synth-pop songs
Songs written by Giorgio Spagna